In mathematics, an ∞-topos is, roughly, an ∞-category such that its objects behave like sheaves of spaces with some choice of Grothendieck topology; in other words, it gives an intrinsic notion of sheaves without reference to an external space. The prototypical example of an ∞-topos is the ∞-category of sheaves of spaces on some topological space. But the notion is more flexible; for example, the ∞-category of étale sheaves on some scheme is not the ∞-category of sheaves on any topological space but it is still an ∞-topos.

Precisely, in Lurie's Higher Topos Theory, an ∞-topos is defined as an ∞-category X such that there is a small ∞-category C and a left exact localization functor from the ∞-category of presheaves of spaces on C to X. A theorem of Lurie states that an ∞-category is an ∞-topos if and only if it satisfies an ∞-categorical version of Giraud’s axioms in ordinary topos theory. A "topos" is a category behaving like the category of sheaves of sets on a topological space. In analogy, Lurie's definition and characterization theorem of an ∞-topos says that an ∞-topos is an ∞-category behaving like the category of sheaves of spaces.

See also 

Homotopy hypothesis
∞-groupoid
Simplicial set
Kan complex

References

Further reading 
Spectral Algebraic Geometry - Charles Rezk (gives a down-enough-to-earth introduction)

Foundations of mathematics
Higher category theory
Sheaf theory
Topos theory